Park Central may refer to:

 Park Central, Birmingham, England, UK; a real estate development
 Park Central, Gauteng, Johannesburg, South Africa; a suburb
 Park Central (Hong Kong), a housing estate and shopping mall
 Park Central Building, Los Angeles, California, USA; an office building
 Park Central Hotel, Manhattan, New York City, State of New York, USA
 Park Central Hotel San Francisco, San Francisco, California, USA
 Park Central Mall, Phoenix, Arizona, USA; a shopping mall

See also

 Central (disambiguation)
 Park (disambiguation)
 Central Park (disambiguation)